Anne Tauber (born 19 May 1995) is a female Dutch cross-country mountain biker and marathon speed skater, who currently rides for UCI mountain bike team CST POSTNL BAFANG and skates for Van Ramshorst / Blue Dune. 

She is qualified to represent the Netherlands at the 2020 Olympics along with fellow cyclist Anne Terpstra. In 2018 Tauber won the 200-kilometer long Alternative Elfstedentocht speed skating marathon classic on the Austrian Weissensee.

Major results
2016
 3rd Overall UCI Under-23 World Cup
 3rd National XCO Championships
2017
 1st  National XCO Championships
 3rd  European Under-23 XCO Championships
2019
 1st  National XCO Championships
2020
 2nd National XCO Championships
2021
 3rd  UEC European XCO Championships

References

External links

1995 births
Living people
Dutch female cyclists
Dutch mountain bikers
Cross-country mountain bikers
Cyclists at the 2020 Summer Olympics
Olympic cyclists of the Netherlands
Sportspeople from Heerenveen
Cyclists from Friesland
21st-century Dutch women